Pseudamia hayashii, commonly known as Hayashi's cardinalfish, is a species of cardinalfish native to the Indian and Pacific Oceans frpm the Gulf of Aden to Samoa, north to southern Japan and south to Western Australia. The specific name honours the Japanese ichthyologist Masayoshi Hayashi, a curator at the Yokosuka City Museum, who has studied the cardinalfishes of Japan and who lent a specimen of P. hayashi on learning of the authors'  research on the genus Pseudamia.

References

Fish of India
Fish of Japan
Fish of Australia
Fish described in 1985
Fish of the Indian Ocean
Fish of the Pacific Ocean
Pseudaminae